SMS  was an armored cruiser of the Imperial German Navy, built at the Blohm & Voss shipyard in Hamburg, Germany. She was the lead ship of her class, which included .  and her sister were enlarged versions of the preceding ; they were equipped with a greater number of main guns and were capable of a higher top speed. The ship was named after the Prussian military reformer General Gerhard von Scharnhorst and commissioned into service on 24 October 1907.

 served briefly with the High Seas Fleet in Germany in 1908, though most of this time was spent conducting sea trials. She was assigned to the German East Asia Squadron based in Tsingtao, China, in 1909. After arriving, she replaced the cruiser  as the squadron flagship, a position she would hold for the rest of her career. Over the next five years, she went on several tours of various Asian ports to show the flag for Germany. She frequently carried the squadron commanders to meet Asian heads of state and was present in Japan for the coronation of the Taishō Emperor in 1912.

On 1 November 1914,  and the rest of the East Asia Squadron encountered and overpowered a British squadron at the Battle of Coronel. The defeat prompted the British Admiralty to dispatch two battlecruisers to hunt down and destroy the German squadron, which they accomplished at the Battle of the Falkland Islands on 8 December 1914. The discovery of the wreck was announced in December 2019 by Mensun Bound.

Design 

The two -class cruisers were ordered as part of the naval construction program laid out in the Second Naval Law of 1900, which called for a force of fourteen armored cruisers.

She was powered by three triple-expansion steam engines with steam provided by eighteen coal-fired water-tube boilers.

s primary armament consisted of eight  SK L/40 guns, four in twin gun turrets, one fore and one aft of the main superstructure on the centerline, and the remaining four mounted in single casemates. The secondary armament included six  SK L/40 guns, also in individual casemates that were placed a deck below the main battery casemates. Defense against torpedo boats was provided by a battery of eighteen  SK L/35 guns mounted in casemates. She was also equipped with four  submerged torpedo tubes. One was mounted in the bow, one on each broadside, and the fourth was placed in the stern.

Service history 

She was commissioned into the fleet a year and a half later on 24 October 1907. She then began sea trials; while conducting speed tests she exceeded her design speed by one knot, reaching .

From 6 to 11 November, her trials were interrupted by a voyage to Vlissingen in the Netherlands and Portsmouth in Britain in company with Kaiser Wilhelm II's yacht  and the light cruiser . On 14 January 1908,  ran aground off the Bülk Lighthouse and suffered serious underwater damage. Repairs were made at Blohm & Voss, and lasted until 22 February. She then resumed her trials, which continued until the end of April. During the rest of the year, she participated in the normal peacetime routine of training exercises and fleet maneuvers.

East Asia Squadron

1909–1911
After completing preparations for the voyage,  left Kiel on 1 April; aboard was  Friedrich von Ingenohl, who was to take command of the East Asia Squadron upon his arrival. There,  took over the role of squadron flagship. In July and August,  went on a cruise in the Yellow Sea and in August surveyed ports in the area.

By 22 March,  and  had returned to the German port at Tsingtao. In the meantime,  had left the East Asia Squadron in February; her replacement, arrived on 9 April. Stops included the Mariana Islands, Truk, and Apia in German Samoa. While there, the new light cruiser  arrived on 22 July to further strengthen the East Asia Squadron.

In 1910,  won the Kaiser's  (Shooting Prize) for excellent gunnery in the East Asia Squadron. On 25 November,  and the rest of the squadron went on a trip to Hong Kong and Nanjing; while in Hong Kong, an outbreak of typhus struck. Among those who were infected was Gühler, who succumbed to the disease on 21 January 1911. She then returned to Tsingtao by way of Hong Kong and Amoy, arriving on 1 March. There,  Günther von Krosigk was waiting to take command of the squadron. Two weeks later, the squadron was reinforced by the arrival of s sister ship  on 14 March.

From 30 March to 12 May,  went on a cruise in Japanese waters with Krosigk aboard. She thereafter steamed to the northern area of the German protectorate in early July; at the time tensions were high in Europe due to the Agadir Crisis. Krosigk attempted to keep the situation calm in East Asia and he took his flagship on a tour of harbors in the Yellow Sea. By 15 September, the cruiser was back in Tsingtao. After arriving in Tsingtao,  went into dock for her annual repair; Krosigk accordingly shifted his flag to  temporarily. On 10 October, the Xinhai Revolution against the Qing Dynasty broke out, causing a great deal of tension amongst the Europeans, who recalled the attacks on foreigners during the Boxer Uprising of 1900–1901. The rest of the East Asia Squadron was placed on alert to protect German interests and additional troops were sent to protect the German consulate. But the feared attacks on Europeans did not materialize and so the East Asia Squadron was not needed.

1912–1914

By late November,  was back in service and Krosigk returned to the ship. She cruised to Shanghai by way of Tientsin and Yantai, arriving on 12 December. From 14 to 24 January 1912,  toured the ports of the central China coast and returned to Tsingtao on 9 March, where the rest of the squadron had assembled. On 13 April, the ships went on a month-long cruise to Japanese waters, returning to Tsingtao on 13 May. From 17 July to 4 September,  went on another tour of Japanese ports and during this period she also visited Vladivostok in Russia and several ports in the Yellow Sea.

On 30 July, the Japanese Meiji Emperor died;  escorted , which carried Prince Heinrich, Wilhelm II's brother, to the Meiji Emperor's funeral and the coronation ceremony for the Taishō Emperor. The ships remained in Japan from 5 to 26 September. After returning to Tsingtao, Prince Heinrich conducted an inspection of the entire East Asia Squadron. On 4 December, Krosigk handed over command of the squadron to  Maximilian von Spee. The two cruisers reached Tsingtao on 2 March 1913. From 1 April to 7 May,  took Spee to Japan to meet the Taishō Emperor. Starting on 22 June, Spee began a tour of Germany's Pacific colonies aboard his flagship. The ship stopped in the Marianas, the Admiralty Islands, the Hermit Islands, Rabaul in Neupommern, and Friedrich-Wilhelmshafen in German New Guinea.

While in Rabaul on 21 July, Spee received word of further unrest in China, which prompted his return to the Wusong roadstead outside Shanghai by 30 July. After the situation calmed, Spee was able to take his ships on a short cruise to Japan, which began on 11 November.  and the rest of the squadron returned to Shanghai on 29 November, before she departed for another trip to Southeast Asia. Spee met with Vajiravudh, the King of Siam, and also visited Sumatra, North Borneo, and Manila.  returned to Tsingtao on 19 March 1914. He came back aboard  on 11 May and the ship returned to Tsingtao. Spee thereafter began preparations for a cruise to German New Guinea;  departed on 20 June, leaving only  behind in Tsingtao.

They then sailed south, arriving in Truk in early July where they would restock their coal supplies. While en route, they received news of the assassination of Archduke Franz Ferdinand, heir to the throne of Austria-Hungary. On 17 July, the East Asia Squadron arrived in Ponape in the Caroline Islands. Spee now had access to the German radio network and he learned of the Austro-Hungarian declaration of war on Serbia on 28 July and the Russian mobilization against Austria-Hungary and possibly Germany on 30 July. On 31 July, word came that the German ultimatum that Russia demobilize its armies was set to expire. Spee ordered his ships be stripped for war. On 2 August, Wilhelm II ordered German mobilization against Russia and its ally, France.

World War I 

On 6 August 1914, the supply ship , and the Japanese collier  were still in Ponape. Spee had issued orders to recall the light cruisers, which had been dispersed on cruises around the Pacific.  joined Spee that day, after which Spee moved his ships to Pagan Island in the Northern Mariana Islands, a German possession in the central Pacific. Spee left for Pagan in the night, without , to avoid having the Japanese crew betray his movements.

All available colliers, supply ships, and passenger liners were ordered to meet the East Asia Squadron in Pagan and  joined the squadron there on 12 August. The auxiliary cruiser  joined Spee's ships there as well. While en route to Enewetak Atoll in the Marshall Islands the next morning,  left the formation with one of the colliers. The remaining ships again coaled after their arrival in Enewetak on 20 August.

To keep the German high command informed, on 8 September Spee detached  to Honolulu to send word through neutral countries.  returned with news of the Allied capture of German Samoa, which had taken place on 29 August.  and  sailed to Apia to investigate the situation. Spee had hoped to catch a British or Australian warship by surprise, but upon his arrival on 14 September, he found no warships in the harbor. On 22 September,  and the rest of the East Asia Squadron arrived at the French colony of Papeete. The Germans attacked the colony, and in the ensuing Battle of Papeete, they sank the French gunboat . The ships came under fire from French shore batteries but were undamaged. Fear of mines in the harbor prevented Spee from entering the harbor to seize the coal, which the French had set on fire.

By 12 October,  and the rest of the squadron had reached Easter Island. After a week in the area, the ships departed for Chile. On the evening of 26 October,  and the rest of the squadron steamed out of Mas a Fuera, Chile and headed eastward, arriving in Valparaíso on 30 October. On 1 November, Spee learned from  that the British light cruiser  had been anchored in Coronel the previous day, so he turned towards the port to try to catch her alone.

Battle of Coronel 

The British had scant resources to oppose the German squadron off the coast of South America. The flotilla was reinforced by the elderly pre-dreadnought battleship  and the armored cruiser . The latter, however, did not arrive until after the Battle of Coronel. Canopus was left behind by Cradock, who probably felt her slow speed would prevent him from bringing the German ships to battle.

The East Asia Squadron arrived off Coronel on the afternoon of 1 November; to Spee's surprise, he encountered Good Hope, Monmouth, and Otranto in addition to Glasgow. Canopus was still some  behind, with the British colliers. At 16:17, Glasgow spotted the German ships. Cradock formed a line of battle with Good Hope in the lead, followed by Monmouth, Glasgow, and Otranto in the rear. Spee decided to hold off engaging until the sun had set more, at which point the British ships would be silhouetted by the sun, while his own ships would be obscured against the coast behind them. Cradock realized the uselessness of Otranto in the line of battle and detached her.

Once the German gunners found the range, they began firing rapidly, with one salvo of high-explosive shells every fifteen seconds. (Lieutenant at Sea) Knoop, the spotting officer aboard , reported that "Continual hits could be observed ... in the midships Good Hope was hit repeatedly, with much fire resulting ... the interior of this part of the ship was on fire, which could be seen through the portholes, shining brightly."

One of her  shells struck  in the forecastle but failed to explode. At the same time,  closed to point-blank range of Monmouth and poured shells into her. At 19:23, Good Hopes guns fell silent following two large explosions; the German gunners ceased fire shortly thereafter. Good Hope disappeared into the darkness. Spee ordered his light cruisers to close with his battered opponents and finish them off with torpedoes, while he took  and  further south to get out of the way.

Glasgow was forced to abandon Monmouth after 19:20 when the German light cruisers approached, before fleeing south and meeting with Canopus. A squall prevented the Germans from discovering Monmouth, but she eventually capsized and sank at 20:18. More than 1,600 men were killed in the sinking of the two armored cruisers, including Cradock. German losses were negligible. However, the German ships had expended over 40 percent of their ammunition supply.  was hit twice during the engagement, but both shells failed to explode. The second hit passed through her third funnel and did not explode; she was struck by shell splinters that damaged her wireless antenna array. She suffered no casualties and the only German injuries were two slightly wounded men aboard .

Voyage to the Falklands

After the battle, Spee took his ships north to Valparaiso. In Valparaiso, Spee's ships could take on coal while he conferred with the Admiralty Staff in Germany to determine the strength of remaining British forces in the region. The ships remained in the port for only 24 hours, in accordance with the neutrality restrictions, and arrived at Mas a Fuera on 6 November, where they took on more coal from captured British and French steamers. On 18 November,  and  met Spee while en route and the squadron reached St. Quentin Bay three days later. There, they took on more coal, since the voyage around Cape Horn would be a long one and it was unclear when they would have another opportunity to coal.

Once word of the defeat reached London, the Royal Navy set to organizing a force to hunt down and destroy the East Asia Squadron. The force of eight ships reached the Falklands by 7 December, where they immediately coaled.

In the meantime, Spee's ships departed St. Quentin Bay on 26 November and rounded Cape Horn on 2 December. The crews transferred the coal from Drummuir to the squadron's colliers. On the morning of 6 December, Spee held a conference with the ship commanders aboard  to determine their next course of action. The Germans had received numerous fragmentary and contradictory reports of British reinforcements in the region; Spee and two other captains favored an attack on the Falklands, while three other commanders argued that it would be better to bypass the islands and attack British shipping off Argentina. Spee's opinion carried the day and the squadron departed for the Falklands at 12:00.

Battle of the Falkland Islands 

Observers aboard  spotted smoke rising from Port Stanley, but assumed it was the British burning their coal stocks to prevent the Germans from seizing them. As they closed on the harbor,  shells from Canopus, which had been beached as a guard ship, began to fall around the German ships, which prompted Spee to break off the attack. The fast battlecruisers quickly got up steam and sailed out of the harbor to pursue the slower East Asia Squadron.

Meanwhile, Sturdee detached his cruisers to pursue the German light cruisers. Invincible opened fire at  while Inflexible attacked  and Spee ordered his two armored cruisers to similarly engage their opposites. Spee had taken the lee position; the wind kept his ships swept of smoke, which improved visibility for his gunners. This forced Sturdee into the windward position and its corresponding worse visibility.  straddled Invincible with her third salvo and quickly scored two hits on the British battlecruiser. The German flagship was not hit during this phase of the battle.

Sturdee attempted to widen the distance by turning two points to the north to prevent Spee from closing to within the range of his numerous secondary guns. Spee counteracted this maneuver by turning rapidly to the south, which forced Sturdee to turn south as well to keep within range. Their shooting was so accurate that it forced the British to haul away a second time. After resuming the battle, the British gunfire became more accurate;  was hit several times and fires broke out. The pace of her gunfire started to slacken, though she continued to score hits on Invincible. Sturdee then turned to port in an attempt to take the leeward position, but Spee countered the turn to retain his favorable position; the maneuvering did, however, reverse the order of the ships, so  now engaged Inflexible.

By this stage of the battle,  had a slight list to port and was about a meter lower in the water. Her third funnel had been shot away.  was briefly obscured by smoke, which led both battlecruisers to target . By 16:00, Spee ordered  to attempt to escape while he reversed course and attempted to launch torpedoes at his pursuers. The port list had increased significantly by this point and she was well down by the bow, with only  of freeboard. All 860 officers and men on board, including Spee, went down with the ship. Only  managed to escape, but she was eventually tracked to the Juan Fernandez Islands and sunk. The complete destruction of the squadron killed about 2,200 German sailors and officers, including two of Spee's sons.

In mid-1915, a coastal steamer found the body of a German sailor off the coast of Brazil. The sailor was buried in Brazil and the flag was eventually returned to Germany, where it was placed on display at the Museum für Meereskunde (Marine Science) in Berlin, though it was lost during World War II. At the launching of the new  in October 1936, the widow of the earlier ship's captain was present.

Wreck 
An expedition led by the marine archaeologist Mensun Bound searching for the ships of Spee's squadron began in 2014, but had no success. Most of the superstructure has been destroyed or lies around the wreck, but the greater part of the hull is still intact.

Notes

Footnotes

Citations

References

Further reading
 

1906 ships
Maritime incidents in December 1914
Scharnhorst-class cruisers
Ships built in Hamburg
Warships lost in combat with all hands
Shipwrecks of the Falkland Islands
World War I cruisers of Germany
World War I shipwrecks in the Atlantic Ocean